Paul Johansson (born January 26, 1964) is an American-born Canadian actor and director in film and television, best known for playing Dan Scott on the WB/CW series, One Tree Hill, and for his role as Nick Wolfe on the short lived Highlander: The Series  spin-off Highlander: The Raven. He directed the 2011 film adaptation of Ayn Rand's novel, Atlas Shrugged: Part I.

Acting career 
Johansson landed his first role on the soap opera Santa Barbara. He played Greg Hughes from 1989 to 1990. Soon he made appearances in other television shows such as Parker Lewis Can't Lose and Beverly Hills, 90210, and later recurred on Lonesome Dove: The Series and starred on Lonesome Dove: The Outlaw Years.

Johansson became well-known to fans of 90210 for playing John Sears, a fraternity brother who unsuccessfully vied for the affections of Kelly Taylor (Jennie Garth) and set up Steve Sanders (Ian Ziering) to burglarize a professor's office. The character returned for the season 4 finale.

He also appeared in commercials, most notably as the delivery man in a Diet Coke commercial. He has appeared in the films Soapdish, John Q and Alpha Dog, and had a small uncredited role in The Notebook. He portrayed the role of Dan Scott in One Tree Hill beginning in 2003 until the show's end in 2012. He subsequently featured in Takashi Miike's 2003 film Gozu, appearing as a man with a cow's head. In 2003 Johansson wrote and directed the film The Incredible Mrs. Ritchie. He has also directed several episodes of One Tree Hill. In 2006 he starred in Emily Skopov's Novel Romance, alongside Traci Lords and Sherilyn Fenn. He appeared in the 7th season of The Drew Carey Show, playing a sportscaster.

He is the director of Atlas Shrugged: Part I (2011), the first third of a trilogy based on the novel by Ayn Rand. The film received an approval rating of 12% on Rotten Tomatoes based on reviews from 52 critics.

Personal life 

His mother, Joanne Leone Johansson, died on October 14, 2011, after a 20-year battle with breast cancer. The eleventh episode of the ninth season of the CW's One Tree Hill (titled "Danny Boy", in which Paul's character Dan Scott dies) was dedicated to her memory.

Filmography

Film

Television

As a director

References

External links
 
 

1964 births
American male film actors
American male television actors
Male actors from Spokane, Washington
Daytime Emmy Award winners
Living people
Canadian male film actors
Canadian male television actors
Canadian people of American descent
Male actors from British Columbia
People from Kelowna
University of British Columbia alumni
UBC Thunderbirds basketball players
20th-century American male actors
21st-century American male actors